Ammonites are an extinct group of marine animals. The term can specifically refer to members of:
Ammonoidea, a subclass
Ammonitida, an order
Ammonitina, a suborder

Ammonite may also refer to:

Art and entertainment 
Ammonite (film), a 2020 film
Ammonite order, an architectural order featuring ammonite-shaped capitals
Ammonite (novel), a 1992  novel by Nicola Griffith
Ammonite (album), an album by the Japanese rock group Plastic Tree

Other uses 
Ammonites (people), a nation of the ancient Levant, mentioned in the Bible
Ammonite language, language of the Ammonites
Anti-Nephi-Lehies, also known as Ammonites, a people from the Book of Mormon
Ammonite (explosive), a form of amatol

See also 
Amniote, a group of vertebrate organisms
Amun (also Ammon), the ancient Egyptian god after whom the animals are named